An arakhchi (is a traditional Armenian hat that was also worn by the Azeri Turks, made from specially woven silks, that is the most persistent of traditional garments, sometimes worn over a low (6 cm) flat topped skullcap (araqčın), almost covered with gold embroidery, or alternatively a small bonnet (täsäk).}}</ref> flat top skull cap headdress, worn by both men and women in the past.

Arakhchis could be sewn of various textiles, such as tirma wool and silk. However, only one single-colour textile per arakhchi was used. The textile was made into a round shape fitting the head and then decorated with embroidery, lace, beads and even pieces of gold. Men's arakhchis were relatively plain, especially those used for religious purposes.

In Western Armenia, men, especially freedom fighters, wore a red arakhchi draped with a bandana with tinsel as their native headgear to identify themselves. The Armenian arakhchi was a truncated skull cap, knitted from wool or embroidered with multicolored woolen thread and a predominance of red. The way this traditional headdress was worn was a marker of its owner's marital condition, just as in Eastern Armenia, the right to wear an arakhchi belonged to a married man. Even though the arakhchi was traditionally a man's hat, Armenian women wore this headress as well; especially in Muş where Armenian singer Armenouhi Kevonian was known for her colorful arakhchi at her concerts.

An arakhchi could be worn alone or under other headdresses, such as papakhi, a turban or a kalaghai. Women's arakhchis worn as early as the sixteenth century often lacked a special sack intended for braids. By the eighteenth century, it was already one of the most widespread headgears. Women used hairpins to secure their veils on the arakhchin.

Arakhchins generally went out of use in the early twentieth century, with the mass adoption of European-style dress in Armenia and in what is now considered the Republic of Azerbaijan.

References

External links
 Araxçın

Headgear
Azerbaijani clothing
Azerbaijani words and phrases
Armenian clothing

az:Araxçın
ru:Арахчын